Vasselay is a commune in the Cher department in the Centre-Val de Loire region of France.

Geography
A farming area comprising the village and a couple of hamlets situated immediately north of Bourges on the D58 road.

Population

Sights
 The church, dating from the nineteenth century.
 The chateau of Puyvallée, dating from the eighteenth century.

See also
Communes of the Cher department

References

External links

Website of the commune of Vasselay 

Communes of Cher (department)